Margarita Graddon or Mrs Gibbs (born 1804) was a British popular singer.

Life
Graddon was born in Bishops Lydeard near Taunton in 1804. She was trained by Tom Cooke and then sang in the provinces until she appeared at Vauxhall Gardens in 1822, later in Dublin, and then at Drury Lane Theatre in 1824 in The Marriage of Figaro. The same year she appeared in Henry Bishop's version of Der Freischütz. Her appearance as Linda was recorded in a portrait by William Brockedon.

In 1827 she married a pianoforte maker named Alexander Gibbs. There was a pianoforte company called Graddon and Gibbs".

She  toured in the United States in 1834 and 1835. In 1844 she was again appearing at Vauxhall and being paid five pounds a week.

She was credited with writing a polka titled "Le Bal Costumél" and she appears on the cover of the sheet music, but the music is also attributed to her husband. She was last mentioned in 1855 when she was appearing in The Lakes of Killarney'' in New York.

References

1804 births
People from Taunton
English women singers
Year of death unknown